Gertrude Elliott (December 14, 1874 — December 24, 1950), later Lady Forbes-Robertson, was an American stage actress, part of an extended family of theatre professionals including her husband, Sir Johnston Forbes-Robertson, and her elder sister, Maxine Elliott.

Early life
May Gertrude Dermot (or Dermott) was born in Rockland, Maine, a daughter of Thomas and Adelaide Hall Dermot (or Dermott). Her father was a sea captain born in Ireland, and her mother had been a schoolteacher. Her older sister Maxine left the household for New York City by age 16, and Gertrude soon followed. Both of them began using the surname "Elliott" as young women.

Career

Elliott's career on stage began in 1894, with a role in Oscar Wilde's A Woman of No Importance, in a company that was touring New York state. Both Elliotts joined a company in San Francisco that toured Australia in 1896. The company was run by Nat C. Goodwin, an actor who soon married Maxine Elliott. Their company went to London in 1899, and the next year Gertrude was hired into the company of Johnston Forbes-Robertson; Gertrude Elliott and Forbes-Robertson married at the end of 1900, and continued to work together predominantly in Shakespearean works for much of their careers.

Away from the stage, Gertrude Elliott starred with her husband in a silent film version of Hamlet in 1913, directed by their friend J. H. Ryley. She also appeared in a 1917 silent film, Masks and Faces. Gertrude Elliott was a co-founder and president of the Actresses' Franchise League. During World War I she managed the "Shakespeare Hut" in Bloomsbury, a project of the YMCA for entertaining and raising morale among war workers. In 1923, New Zealand gave Gertrude Elliott an award for her work for ANZAC troops during the war.

Personal life
Elliott married English actor Johnston Forbes-Robertson in 1900. They had four daughters, including aircraft designer Maxine (Blossom) Miles, writer Diana Forbes-Robertson, and actress Jean Forbes-Robertson. Johnston was knighted in 1913, making Gertrude "Lady Forbes-Robertson" from that time. She was widowed when her husband died in 1937, and Gertrude died in 1950, aged 76 years. Her grandchildren include actress Joanna Van Gyseghem.

There is a plaque marking the birthplace of the Elliott sisters in the Trackside Station in Rockland, Maine.

References

External links
The National Portrait Gallery has 21 portraits of Gertrude Elliott, most of them from various theatrical roles.

The Elliott Sisters of Rockland (Gem Productions 2012), a short film about Maxine and Gertrude Elliott, made for Maine Community TV

1874 births
1950 deaths
Actresses from Maine
American silent film actresses
American stage actresses
British women in World War I
British suffragists
People from Rockland, Maine
YMCA leaders
Wives of knights
20th-century American actresses